The Unwritten Code is a 1944 American drama film directed by Herman Rotsten and written by Leslie T. White and Charles Kenyon. The film stars Ann Savage, Tom Neal, Roland Varno, Howard Freeman, Mary Currier and Bobby Larson. The film was released on October 26, 1944, by Columbia Pictures.

Plot

Cast          
Ann Savage as Mary Lee Norris
Tom Neal as Sgt. Terry Hunter
Roland Varno as Cpl. Karl Richter
Howard Freeman as Mr. Norris
Mary Currier as Mrs. Norris
Bobby Larson as Willie Norris
Teddy Infuhr as Dutchy Schultz
 Holmes Herbert as McDowell
 Otto Reichow as Heinrich Krause 
 Theodore von Eltz as Major Spencer
 Blake Edwards as Swede

References

External links
 

1944 films
American drama films
Columbia Pictures films
American black-and-white films
1944 drama films
1940s English-language films
1940s American films